Cláudionor Reinaldo Franco (born 13 February 1940), known as just Nonô, is a Brazilian former footballer who competed in the 1960 Summer Olympics.

References

1940 births
Living people
Association football defenders
Brazilian footballers
Olympic footballers of Brazil
Footballers at the 1960 Summer Olympics
Fluminense FC players